Harvey Rice, LL.D. (1800–1891) was an American lawyer, a Democratic state legislator, poet, author and newspaperman prominent in Cleveland, Ohio.

Early life and education
Harvey Rice was born in Conway, Massachusetts, June 11, 1800 to Stephen Rice and Lucy (Baker) Rice. He received his A.B. degree from Williams College in Williamstown, Massachusetts in 1824.  After graduation, he moved west to Cleveland to study law under the tutelage of Reuben Wood.   In 1826, was admitted to the bar that year and entered law practice as a partner with Reuben Wood. His doctor of laws degree was awarded by Williams College.

Professional career
In 1828, Rice and other partners started a newspaper The Independent News Letter, that was later reorganized and renamed The Plain Dealer in 1842.  In 1829, Rice became the managing editor of the paper.  That same year he was appointed as Justice of the Peace.  In 1830, he was elected as a Representative in the Ohio House of Representatives as a Democrat, serving for two years.   He was appointed in 1830 as agent for the sale of fifty thousand acres Western Reserve School Lands.  Over a three-year period he raised the sum of $150,000 through the sale of the public lands which was used to establish the public school system in Ohio.

In 1851 Rice was elected to the Ohio Senate and served for two years.  During his time in the senate, he was responsible for introduction and passage of laws to reorganize the public school system of the state and establish a system of public libraries.  From 1879 until his death, he was president of the Early Settlers Association of the Western Reserve.

Selected publications
 Rice, H. (1858).  Mt. Vernon and other Poems. Boston, John P. Jewett & Co.; Cleveland, Henry P. B. Jewett, 179pp + notes.
 Rice H.  (1875).  Nature and Culture.  Lee and Shepard Publishers, Boston. 202pp.
 Rice, H. (1883).  Pioneers of the Western Reserve. Lee and Shepard Publishers, Boston. 350pp.

Family life
Harvey Rice married Fannie Rice, daughter of Truman Rice on 27 September 1828 and they had four children: Percival Wood Rice, Fannie Maria Rice, Henrietta M. Rice and Harvey Hayden Rice.  Fannie Rice died 21 December 1837.  Three years after her death, Harvey Rice married Emma Fitch, and they had five children: Henrietta Maria Rice, Emma Fitch Rice, Mary Wood Rice, James Stephen Rice, and Harvey Rice, Jr.   Harvey Rice died on 7 November 1891 in Cleveland and was buried at Cleveland's Lake View Cemetery.

Legacy
For his support of education in Cleveland, an elementary school was named in his honor.  In 1899, the City of Cleveland erected a statue by James G. C. Hamilton in his honor at the Fine Arts Museum Garden Area on East Boulevard in Cleveland.

Genealogy
Harvey Rice was a direct descendant of Edmund Rice, an English immigrant to Massachusetts Bay Colony, as follows:

 Harvey Rice, son of
 Stephen Rice (1769 – 1850) son of
 Cyrus Rice (1726 – 1804), son of
 Josiah Rice (1696 – 1730), son of
 Ephraim Rice (1665 – 1732), son of
 Thomas Rice (1625 – 1681), son of
 Edmund Rice (1594 – 1663)

References

External links
 
 
 

Ohio state senators
Members of the Ohio House of Representatives
1891 deaths
1800 births
Williams College alumni
Lawyers from Cleveland
19th-century American politicians
Politicians from Cleveland
People from Conway, Massachusetts
Burials at Lake View Cemetery, Cleveland
19th-century American lawyers